Marfil is a Costa Rican music group.  

The group's main records are "Celebrando", "Amuletos" and "Que no paren". They have toured in Europe, Latin America and the United States.

Marfil means 'Ivory', in Spanish.

History
Marfil was founded as “Bocaracá” in 1969 in the Atlantic port town of Limón on the Caribbean coast of Costa Rica. Limón (and other Central American countries with Caribbean coast) is known for its Jamaican, Bahamian & Lesser Antillean heritage and reggae rhythms which had a direct influence on the sound of the band.  Their sound blends reggae, soca, soul, and jazz.

It wasn’t until the 1980s decade when Marfil acquired local fame. In 1985, they released “Menealo”, which was their first commercial success. In 1987, they released their iconic song “Represento”, which became their iconic song. “Represento” was originally a Puerto Rican song composed by Lou Briel, which Marfil turned into salsa.

In 1997, the group released “Saca Boom”, one of their last commercial successes. In recent years, Lou Briel & other Puerto Rican artists claimed that Marfil’s version of “Represento” was actually plagiarized.

Members
 Isidor Ash - director and guitarist 
 Roberto Moscoa - percussionist and trumpeter 
 Rogelio Royes - vocalist 
 Omar Gauna - vocalist 
 Orlando Quezada - bass 
 Ricardo Espinach - drums 
 Armando Conejo - keyboard 
 Jose Hernandez - guitarist

References

External links
Marfil on Facebook

Cumbia musical groups
Costa Rican musical groups